Aljassa is a genus of South American anyphaenid sac spiders first described by Antônio Brescovit in 1997.

Species
 it contains five species:
Aljassa annulipes (Caporiacco, 1955) – Venezuela
Aljassa notata (Keyserling, 1881) – Peru
Aljassa poicila (Chamberlin, 1916) – Peru
Aljassa subpallida (L. Koch, 1866) – Colombia
Aljassa venezuelica (Caporiacco, 1955) – Venezuela

References

Anyphaenidae
Araneomorphae genera
Spiders of South America
Taxa named by Antônio Brescovit